Beirnaertia is a genus of flowering plants belonging to the family Menispermaceae.

Its native range is Western Central Tropical Africa.

Species:

Beirnaertia cabindensis

References

Menispermaceae
Menispermaceae genera